Kemsky (masculine), Kemskaya (feminine), or Kemskoye (neuter) may refer to:
Kemsky District, a district of the Republic of Karelia, Russia
Kemsky Uyezd (1785–1927), a former administrative division of the Russian Empire and early Russian SFSR
Kemskoye Urban Settlement, a municipal formation which the town of Kem and three rural localities in Kemsky District of the Republic of Karelia, Russia are incorporated as
Kemsky (family), a princely family of Rurikid stock

See also
Kem (disambiguation)